Gun laws in Nevada regulate the sale, possession, and use of firearms and ammunition in the state of Nevada in the United States.

Summary table

Concealed carry
Nevada is a "shall issue" state for concealed carry. The county sheriff shall issue a concealed firearms permit to applicants who qualify under state and federal law, who submit an application in accordance with the provisions of section NRS 202.3657. To apply for a Concealed Firearm Permit, a person must be 21 (18 for military), complete an approved course in firearm safety and demonstrate competence (qualify) with any handgun. Previously, a single permit applied to only those firearms the applicant qualified with. Under revised legislation, a single permit is valid for all handguns the person owns or may thereafter own. Holders of previous permit iterations are grandfathered per current law and are no longer constrained to their qualified firearms, nor qualified firearm action.

Note: The change in the law regarding competence with semi-automatic handguns is effective July 1, 2011 through Nevada Assembly Bill AB 282. This change is retroactive meaning that permits issued prior to July 1, 2011, that have specific semiautomatic firearms listed is the equivalent to having all semiautomatic firearms authorized.

States that honor a Nevada permit: Alaska, Arizona, Iowa, Idaho, Indiana, Kansas*, Kentucky, Louisiana, Michigan*, Minnesota, Missouri, Montana, Oklahoma, South Dakota, Tennessee, Texas, Utah (*Residential permits only).

As of July 1st, 2021: The State of Nevada no longer honors carry permits from the following states; Florida, Mississippi, South Carolina, South Dakota, and Virginia. This makes it illegal to conceal carry a firearm in the State of Nevada for anyone who has a valid conceal carry permit from these states.

, other state permits that Nevada honors: Alaska, Arizona, Arkansas, Florida, Idaho Enhanced Permit, Illinois, Kansas, Kentucky, Louisiana, Massachusetts, Michigan, Minnesota, Mississippi Enhanced Permit, Montana, Nebraska, New Mexico, North Carolina, North Dakota (both types of permits), Ohio, Oklahoma, South Carolina, South Dakota Enhanced Permit, Tennessee, Texas, Utah, Virginia, West Virginia, Wisconsin, Wyoming. The law allows holders of valid permits from these states to carry a concealed weapon while in the State of Nevada. The valid permit along with current photo I.D. must be in the possession of the person at all times while carrying a concealed firearm.

On February 28, 2013, the Nevada Sheriffs' and Chiefs' association voted unanimously to end the recognition of Arizona concealed weapon permits.

Effective June 23, 2015 Nevada once again recognizes Arizona concealed weapon permits. 

The concealed firearm permit cost differs depending on which county one applies in. The application must be turned in to the county in which the applicant resides. The permit is valid for five years.

Open carry
Nevada is a traditional open carry state with no permit being required to carry openly, as well as complete state preemption of firearms laws. Effective June 2, 2016 SB 175 and SB 240 (duplicate provisions) is legislation that prohibits counties, cities, and towns from enacting ordinances more restrictive than state law.  The legislature reserves for itself the right to legislate all areas of firearm law except unsafe discharge of firearms.

Registration of firearms
Nevada state law does not require the registration of firearms. Following the passage of SB 175, handgun registration (or registration of any kind), is no longer required in Clark County or anywhere in the state of Nevada for handguns or long-arms (which already did not require registration). Governor Brian Sandoval signed this bill into law on June 2, 2015.

Other laws
AB 217, allows residents of contiguous states to purchase long guns in Nevada.  It also allows Nevada residents to purchase long guns in non-contiguous states.  This legislation brings Nevada in line with the protections provided by the Firearms Owners Protection Act, which allows for the interstate sale of long guns by federally licensed firearms dealers.

AB 282 ensures that concealed firearm permit holders' names and addresses remain confidential; revise Nevada state law to allow carrying of any semi-automatic pistol, as with revolvers, once qualified for a CCW permit with a semi-automatic pistol; allows carrying of firearms in Nevada state parks; and statutorily mandates a background investigation (which is currently being done by all Nevada sheriffs) for CCW permit renewals for the purpose of reinstating the National Instant Criminal Background Check System (NICS) exemption for Nevada, thus ensuring that permit holders do not have to go through a point-of-contact check for every firearm purchased, as long as the CCW permit is valid.

AB 291 bans bump stocks, enacts a red flag law, and requires safe storage of firearms.

References

Nevada law
Nevada